Teodora Jankovska (born 16 January 2002) is a Macedonian footballer who plays as a defender for the North Macedonia national team.

International career
Jankovska made her debut for the North Macedonia national team on 29 November 2021, against Northern Ireland.

References

2002 births
Living people
Women's association football defenders
Macedonian women's footballers
North Macedonia women's international footballers